Arroyo Hondo (Spanish: deep stream) may refer to:

United States
 Arroyo Hondo (Santa Clara County, California), a stream
 Arroyo Hondo, Santa Fe County, New Mexico, a census-designated place
 Arroyo Hondo, Taos County, New Mexico, a census-designated place
 Arroyo Hondo Pueblo in New Mexico
 Hondo Creek, Texas; site of the 1842 Battle of Arroyo Hondo

Other nations
 Arroyohondo, a municipality in Colombia
 Arroyo Hondo, Cuba, a settlement in Guantánamo municipality